The Emilia-Romagna regional election of 1975 took place on 15 June 1975.

The Italian Communist Party was by far the largest party, with almost two times the votes of Christian Democracy. After the election Guido Fanti, the incumbent Communist President of the Region, formed a new government with the support of the Italian Socialist Party. In 1976 Fanti was replaced by Sergio Cavina, to whom Lanfranco Turci succeeded in 1978.

Results

Elections in Emilia-Romagna
1975 elections in Italy